This was the first edition of the tournament.

Jiang Xinyu and Tang Qianhui won the title, defeating Rutuja Bhosale and Erika Sema in the final, 6–3, 3–6, [11–9].

Seeds

Draw

Draw

References
Main Draw

Changsha Open - Doubles